Edwin Leong Siu-hung (born 1951/1952) is a Hong Kong billionaire businessman. He is a property investor, and his main company is Tai Hung Fai Enterprise, which he founded in 1977.

As of March 2022, his net worth is estimated at US$4.4 billion.

Early life
Leong is the sixth son of Henry G. Leong, who worked for Jardine Matheson, and was aged nine when his father died.

Career
Leong founded Tai Hung Fai Enterprise in 1977 as a property investment company,  specialising in retail properties and hotels. Privately held, it has grown rapidly to a portfolio that now includes hotels, serviced apartments, retail shops, residential buildings, office buildings and industrial buildings.

Leong has been the vice chairman of Po Leung Kuk charitable organisation.

Personal life
He is married with one child and lives in Hong Kong.

References

1950s births
Living people
Hong Kong billionaires
Hong Kong real estate businesspeople